Castelvetro di Modena is a town and comune (municipality) in the Province of Modena in the Italian region Emilia-Romagna, located about  west of Bologna and about  south of Modena.

Geography
The municipality borders with Castelnuovo Rangone, Formigine, Maranello, Marano sul Panaro, Spilamberto, Serramazzoni and Vignola. It counts the hamlets (frazioni) of Ca' di Sola, Ca' Gatti, Ca' Montanari, Casa Re, Levizzano Rangone, Madonna di Puianello, Sant'Eusebio, Settecani and Solignano Nuovo.

Main sights
Six medieval towers in the historic center
Sanctuary of Puianello
Castle of Levizzano Rangone
Oratory of St Michael, also at Levizzano Rangone
Santi Senesio e Teopompo - church rebuilt in 1907 in neo-gothic style

Gallery

Personalities
Giovanni Muzzioli (1854–1894), painter

Twin towns
 Castelfidardo, Italy, since 1984
 Montlouis-sur-Loire, France, since 2002

References

External links

 Official website

Cities and towns in Emilia-Romagna